The 2015–16  Linafoot season is the 55th since its establishment. Linafoot is the top-flight association football league of DR Congo in Africa. TP Mazembe won the domestic league.

First round

Zone de développement Est

Zone de développement Ouest

Zone de développement Centre-Sud

Final round

References

Linafoot seasons
Congo
football
football